"No More" is a song by British-Norwegian boy band A1. It was released on 19 February 2001 as the third single from their second studio album, The A List (2000). The song was written by Stevie Bensusen, Claudio Cueni, Lindy Robbins, and Damon Sharpe, and produced by the former two. The song was re-produced and remixed by Danish production duo Cutfather & Joe for the song's single release. The song peaked at number six on the UK Singles Chart, becoming the band's seventh consecutive top-10 single.

Music video
The video for "No More" was filmed in Singapore, as the Asian Pacific region was at the time a major market for the boy band sound.

Track listings
 UK CD1
 "No More" (Cutfather & Joe Mix) – 3:43
 "Three Times a Lady" – 3:37
 "I'll Take the Tears" (live on the UK2K Tour) – 4:38

 UK CD2
 "No More" (Riprock 'n' Alex G Mix) – 3:28
 "No More" (E-Smoove Club Mix) – 9:00
 "Livin' La Vida Loca" (live on the UK2K Tour) – 3:45

 UK cassette single
 "No More" (Cutfather & Joe Mix) – 3:43
 "Three Times a Lady" – 3:37

Charts

References

2001 singles
2001 songs
A1 (band) songs
Columbia Records singles
Songs written by Damon Sharpe
Songs written by Lindy Robbins